Paul Michael Donnelly (born 16 February 1981) is an English former football player and coach.

A defender, he played eleven games in the Football League for Port Vale between 1998 and 2002. Following this he played non-league football for Stone Dominoes until 2005, at which point he signed with Nantwich Town. Three years later he signed with Newcastle Town via Witton Albion. He moved on to Stafford Rangers in 2011, before joining Kidsgrove Athletic the following year. He signed with Leek Town in July 2013, before returning to Kidsgrove Athletic in May 2015. In June 2016, he returned to Leek Town as assistant manager to Anthony Danylyk, before following Danylyk to Belper Town 12-months later.

Playing career
Donnelly graduated through the Port Vale youth team, and turned professional under Brian Horton. He made four First Division appearances in the 1999–2000 relegation season, and featured once in the Second Division in 2000–01, before he was released from Vale Park after playing eight league and cup games in 2001–02. He dropped out of the Football League in July 2002 to sign for Stone Dominoes of the North West Counties Football League. In his first season with the club they won promotion to the First Division as runners-up of the Second Division. He stayed for three years before joining Nantwich Town in 2005. With Nantwich he lifted the FA Vase in 2006 following a 3–1 win over Hillingdon Borough at St Andrew's. He also helped the club win promotion out of the Northern Premier League Division One South, following a penalty shoot-out win over Sheffield in the 2008 play-off final. They also won the Cheshire Senior Cup that same year after a penalty shoot-out victory over Altrincham. In all he played 95 games before joining Witton Albion three years later. He scored one goal in 23 games for Witton in the 2008–09 season.

In December 2008 he signed with Newcastle Town. He impressed at Town, winning the attention of Kidsgrove Athletic, however the Newcastle captain turned down the chance to play at a higher level, instead choosing to stay with Town. In 2009–10 his side won promotion to the Northern Premier League Division One South, after finishing top of the North West Counties Football League Premier Division. Town finished 24 points clear of second place New Mills. In 2010–11 he led Town to a second-place finish, though they lost 3–0 to Grantham Town in the play-off semi-finals.

In 2011, he joined Northern Premier League Premier Division side Stafford Rangers, whilst also working as an administrator at Staffordshire University. He captained Rangers to a 16th-place finish in 2011–12. He left the club in May 2012. Two months later, he signed with Kidsgrove Athletic. He helped "Kiddy" to an 18th-place finish in the Northern Premier League Division One South in 2012–13. He signed with league rivals Leek Town in July 2013. He helped the "Blues" to secure a play-off spot with a third-place finish in 2013–14, where they were knocked out by Belper Town at Harrison Park. They again reached the play-offs in 2014–15, losing to Sutton Coldfield Town in the final.

Donnelley re-joined Kidsgrove Athletic in May 2015 after being signed by manager Peter Ward. Kidsgrove finished in 15th place in 2015–16.

Coaching career
Donnelley joined Leek Town as manager Anthony Danylyk's assistant in May 2016. In June 2017, he followed Danylyk to Leek's Northern Premier League Division One South rivals Belper Town. The pair left the club five months later, citing a change in personal circumstances.

Career statistics
Source:

Honours
Stone Dominoes
North West Counties Football League Division Two second-place promotion: 2002–03

Nantwich Town
FA Vase: 2006
Cheshire Senior Cup: 2008
Northern Premier League Division One South play-offs: 2008

Newcastle Town
North West Counties Football League Premier Division: 2009–10

References

Living people
1981 births
English footballers
Sportspeople from Newcastle-under-Lyme
Association football defenders
Port Vale F.C. players
Stone Dominoes F.C. players
Nantwich Town F.C. players
Witton Albion F.C. players
Newcastle Town F.C. players
Stafford Rangers F.C. players
Kidsgrove Athletic F.C. players
Leek Town F.C. players
English Football League players
Northern Premier League players
Association football coaches